2093 Genichesk, provisional designation , is a Baptistina asteroid from the inner regions of the asteroid belt, approximately 12 kilometers in diameter. It was discovered on 28 April 1971, by Russian astronomer Tamara Smirnova at the Crimean Astrophysical Observatory in Nauchnyj, on the Crimean peninsula. It was named for the Ukrainian town Henichesk.

Orbit and classification 

Genichesk is a member of the Baptistina family. It orbits the Sun in the inner main-belt at a distance of 1.9–2.7 AU once every 3 years and 5 months (1,249 days). Its orbit has an eccentricity of 0.17 and an inclination of 6° with respect to the ecliptic. A first precovery was taken at Palomar Observatory in 1950, extending the body's observation arc by 21 years prior to its official discovery.

Physical characteristics

Diameter and albedo 

The Collaborative Asteroid Lightcurve Link assumes a standard albedo for carbonaceous C-type asteroids of 0.57 and calculates a diameter of 12.29 kilometers, based on an absolute magnitude of 13.28, while according to preliminary data from the NEOWISE mission of NASA's Wide-field Infrared Survey Explorer, the asteroid's surface has a much higher albedo of 0.158 and only measures 8.8 kilometers in diameter.

Rotation period 

The results concur with observations made by French amateur astronomers Stéphane Charbonnel and Laurent Bernasconi, and with analysed data from the Palomar Transient Factory Survey in 2004 and 2015, respectively.

Naming 

This minor planet was named after the Ukrainian town Genichesk (Henichesk), the discoverer's birthplace in the former Ukrainian Soviet Socialist Republic. The official naming citation was published by the Minor Planet Center on 1 April 1980.

Notes

References

External links 
  
 Asteroid Lightcurve Database (LCDB), query form (info )
 Dictionary of Minor Planet Names, Google books
 Asteroids and comets rotation curves, CdR – Observatoire de Genève, Raoul Behrend
 Discovery Circumstances: Numbered Minor Planets (1)-(5000) – Minor Planet Center
 
 

 

002093
Discoveries by Tamara Mikhaylovna Smirnova
Named minor planets
19710428